Ben Litfin (born 25 March 1995) is an Australian footballer who last played for Port Melbourne Shark in the NPL Victoria.

Club career

Gold Coast City
In the 2016 season, he was temporarily the chief penalty-taker for Gold Coast City, helping him win the golden boot after he scored 19 goals in 20 matches. He also won the Total Compression NPL Player of the month award in May and the Total Compression NPL player of the year award.

Wellington Phoenix
In October 2016, Litfin returned to the A-League when he signed a one-year contract with Wellington Phoenix. Three months after joining Litfin left Wellington Phoenix by mutual consent.

Bentleigh Greens
To start the 2017 season, Ben Litfin made his debut for Bentleigh Greens in a 2–1 FFV Community Shield win over South Melbourne. According to Bentleigh Greens coach John Anastasiadis, he is able to cause difficulties for the opposition deep within their box, befitting the number 10 role.

Inspired Bentleigh Greens to come back 4-4 to draw Pascoe Vale FC with a goal and assist.

Other

Litfin was affirmed as NPL Queensland U-23 Select Team captain in their match versus Brisbane Roar U23.

Things have gone down hill for Litfin, who is Currently is playing in the Div 2 Goals Competition in Robina, where his team is dead last with a +/- of -80 Goals. He said recently in an interview if Max McLennan wasn't carrying him throughout the tournament he would hang up the boots up permanently.

Honours
NPL Victoria Team of the Week 2017: Round 2
NPL Player of the Month
NPL Player of the Year
2013–14 A-League winners medal

Boxing career

Litfin has always loved the sport of boxing, idolizing Sugar Ray Robinson and Guile from Street Fighter. Benny "The Jam" Litfin recently won his first amateur boxing fight on the Gold Coast on Nov 11, 2022 via Split Decision.

References

External links
 
 
 Sports TG Profile 

Australian soccer players
Brisbane Roar FC players
Wellington Phoenix FC players
A-League Men players
New Zealand Football Championship players
Living people
1995 births
Association football midfielders
Association football forwards
Bentleigh Greens SC
Expatriate association footballers in New Zealand
Australian expatriate soccer players
Bentleigh Greens SC players
Wellington Phoenix FC
National Premier Leagues players
Altona Magic SC players